The 1962 Montgomeryshire by-election was a parliamentary by-election held on 15 May 1962 for the British House of Commons constituency of Montgomeryshire.

Previous MP
The seat had become vacant when, the constituency's Member of Parliament (MP), the Rt Hon. (Edward) Clement Davies died

Clement Davies (19 February 1884 – 23 March 1962) had been Montgomeryshire's MP since the 1929 general election. He had been a Liberal Party member from 1929–1931, a Liberal National MP from 1931 until 1939, then an Independent Liberal member until he rejoined the Liberal Party in August 1942. Davies was the Liberal Party leader from 1945 until 1956.

Candidates
Four candidates were nominated. The list below is set out in descending order of the number of votes received at the by-election.

1. The Liberal Party candidate, was (Hugh) Emlyn Hooson. He was a barrister, born 26 March 1925. Hooson had contested the seat of Conway at the general elections in 1950 and 1951

Hooson won the by-election, in a seat which had been represented by some sort of Liberal continuously since 1880. He retained the seat until he was defeated in the 1979 United Kingdom general election. Hooson was a candidate for the Liberal leadership in 1967. In 1979 he was given a Life Peerage as Baron Hooson.

2. The Conservative candidate was Robert H. Dawson. This was the only Parliamentary election he contested.

3. Representing the Labour Party was Tudor Davies, who also contested no other Parliamentary election.

4. The Rev. Islwyn Ffowc Elis stood for Plaid Cymru, the Welsh nationalist party, which in 1962 had never won a Parliamentary election. He contested the seat for a second time in the 1964 United Kingdom general election.

Result

See also
 Montgomeryshire constituency
 List of United Kingdom by-elections
 United Kingdom by-election records

References

Further reading
 British Parliamentary Election Results 1950-1973, compiled and edited by F.W.S. Craig (Parliamentary Research Services 1983)
 Who's Who of British Members of Parliament, Volume IV 1945-1979, edited by M. Stenton and S. Lees (Harvester Press 1981)

1962 elections in the United Kingdom
By-elections to the Parliament of the United Kingdom in Welsh constituencies
Montgomeryshire
1962 in Wales
1960s elections in Wales